4 by the Beatles is an EP of music by English rock band the Beatles. Released on 1 February 1965, it is the third of three Beatles EPs released in the United States and the second of two by Capitol Records.

History
Although the Beatles' first EP released by Capitol, Four by the Beatles, did not achieve the success the label would have hoped, it did well on the singles chart, which enabled Capitol to create a new series called the "4-By" series, which acted like a "super single". The idea was to market a set of four songs to "complement the artist's singles and albums and not compete with the performer's current hit single". Accordingly, the series' name is a reference to the first Beatles EP from Capitol.

Although initially intended to appear as a single by releasing the "4-By" in a soft sleeve and thus "distinguish the '4-By' product from EP's", 4 by the Beatles was packaged in a cardboard sleeve, similar to regular EP releases. Billboard did not chart the record as a single, either, but as an EP; on the Hot 100, it peaked at number 68, which is also the highest position it achieved on the Cash Box chart. Capitol deleted 4 by the Beatles from its catalogue on 31 December 1965.

4 by the Beatles features four songs that Capitol had released on Beatles '65 in December 1964.

Track listing
Side one

Side two

Chart performance

See also
Four by the Beatles EP
Beatles '65
Four by the Beach Boys EP

References

External links
The Beatles Discography 1962–1970: American EPs page
Bruce Spizer's The Beatles' Story on Capitol Records, Part One: Beatlemania and the Singles website

1965 EPs
Albums produced by George Martin
The Beatles EPs
Capitol Records EPs